The list of ship launches in 1989 includes a chronological list of all ships launched in 1989.


References

1989
Ship launches